William Alfred Fowler was an American nuclear physicist, later astrophysicist, who, with Subrahmanyan Chandrasekhar, won the 1983 Nobel Prize in Physics. He is known for his theoretical and experimental research into nuclear reactions within stars and the energy elements produced in the process and was one of the authors of the influential BFH paper.

Early life
On , Fowler was born in Pittsburgh. Fowler's parents were John MacLeod Fowler and Jennie Summers Watson. Fowler was the eldest of his siblings, Arthur and Nelda.

The family moved to Lima, Ohio, a steam railroad town, when Fowler was two years old. Growing up near the Pennsylvania Railroad yard influenced Fowler's interest in locomotives. In 1973, he travelled to the Soviet Union just to observe the steam engine that powered the Trans-Siberian Railway plying the nearly  route that connects Khabarovsk and Moscow.

Education
In 1933, Fowler graduated from the Ohio State University, where he was a member of the Tau Kappa Epsilon fraternity. In 1936, Fowler received a Ph.D. in nuclear physics from the California Institute of Technology in Pasadena, California.

Career
In 1936, Fowler became a research fellow at Caltech. He was elected to the United States National Academy of Sciences in 1938. In 1939, Fowler became an assistant professor at Caltech.

Although an experimental nuclear physicist, Fowler's most famous paper was "Synthesis of the Elements in Stars", coauthored with Cambridge cosmologist Fred Hoyle and in collaboration with two young Cambridge astronomers, Margaret Burbidge and Geoffrey Burbidge.  That 1957 paper in Reviews of Modern Physics categorized most nuclear processes for origin of all but the lightest chemical elements in stars.  It is widely known as the BFH paper.

In 1942, Fowler became an associate professor at Caltech. In 1946, Fowler became a Professor at Caltech. Fowler, along with Lee A. DuBridge, Max Mason, Linus Pauling, and Bruce H. Sage, was awarded the Medal for Merit in 1948 by President Harry S. Truman.

Fowler succeeded Charles Lauritsen as director of the W. K. Kellogg Radiation Laboratory at Caltech, and was himself later succeeded by Steven E. Koonin. Fowler was awarded the National Medal of Science by President Gerald Ford.

Fowler was elected to the American Philosophical Society in 1962, won the Henry Norris Russell Lectureship of the American Astronomical Society in 1963, elected to the American Academy of Arts and Sciences in 1965, won the Vetlesen Prize in 1973, the Eddington Medal in 1978, the Bruce Medal of the Astronomical Society of the Pacific in 1979, and the Nobel Prize in Physics in 1983 (shared with Subrahmanyan Chandrasekhar) for his theoretical and experimental studies of the nuclear reactions of importance in the formation of the chemical elements in the universe .

Fowler's doctoral students at Caltech included Donald D. Clayton.

Personal life
A lifelong fan of steam locomotives, Fowler owned several working models of various sizes.

Fowler's first wife was Adriane Fay (née Olmsted) Fowler (1912–1988). They had two daughters, Mary Emily and Martha.

In December 1989, Fowler married Mary Dutcher (1919–2019), an artist, in Pasadena, California.
On , Fowler died from kidney failure in Pasadena, California. He was 83.

Publications

Obituaries

References

External links

 Oral history interview transcript with William Fowler on 8 June 1972, American Institute of Physics, Niels Bohr Library & Archives - Session I
 Oral history interview transcript with William Fowler on 9 June 1972, American Institute of Physics, Niels Bohr Library & Archives - Session II
 Oral history interview transcript with William Fowler on 5 February 1973, American Institute of Physics, Niels Bohr Library & Archives - Session III
 Oral history interview transcript with William Fowler on 6 February 1973, American Institute of Physics, Niels Bohr Library & Archives - Session IV
 Oral history interview transcript with William Fowler on 30 May 1974, American Institute of Physics, Niels Bohr Library & Archives - Session V
 1983 Audio Interview with William Fowler by Martin Sherwin Voices of the Manhattan Project
 W.A. Fowler: Radioactive elements of a low atomic number, Ph.D. dissertation
  including the Nobel Lecture, December 8, 1983 Experimental and Theoretical Nuclear Astrophysics; the Quest for the Origin of the Elements
 Guide to the Papers of William A. Fowler, 1917-1994
 Caughlan and Fowler 1988: THERMONUCLEAR REACTION RATES, Oak Ridge National Laboratory
 Interview with William A. Fowler, Caltech Archives Oral Histories Online

1911 births
1995 deaths
American astronomers
American Nobel laureates
California Institute of Technology alumni
California Institute of Technology faculty
Medal for Merit recipients
Nobel laureates in Physics
Ohio State University alumni
National Medal of Science laureates
Members of the United States National Academy of Sciences
Fellows of the American Physical Society
Presidents of the American Physical Society
Members of the American Philosophical Society
California Institute of Technology fellows